Deepak Adhikari (born 25 December 1982), known by his stage name Dev, is an Indian actor, producer, singer and film writer, known for his works in Bengali cinema and more recently, a politician. He owns the production house Dev Entertainment Ventures.

Born in Keshpur, he made his acting debut in the 2006 film Agnishapath opposite Rachna Banerjee. Dev faced flak after the film was released, and it turned out to be a critical and commercial flop. His starring role in I Love You (2007) opposite Payal Sarkar was his breakthrough. Directed by Ravi Kinagi, the film was critically unsuccessful, but was commercially successful and was quick to resurrect his career. Despite the success, Dev didn't get any work for the next fourteen months.

He made a comeback on the silver screen with Premer Kahini (2008), opposite Koel Mallick, his first with whom he went on to star with in numerous films. A remake of the 2006 Kannada hit Mungaru Male, the film was moderately successful. Dev got another breakthrough in Challenge (2009) which opened to critical and commercial success. He received the Anandalok Awards for Best Actor and Best Action Hero for his performance in the film. He continued to garner commercial success and wider attention through his successful films, including Le Chakka (2010), Dui Prithibi (2010), Paglu (2011), Challenge 2 (2012), Khoka 420 (2013), Rangbaaz (2013) and Chander Pahar (2013).

He had been a recipient of numerous awards, namely Tele Cine Awards, Kalakar Awards, Filmfare Awards East, Filmfare Awards East (2017) and NABC International Bangla Film Award 2017. His accomplishments have made him one of the highest paid and sought out actors of Bengali cinema. Though he has delivered some critically acclaimed performances, Dev is often trolled for his poor accent, average acting skills, his winning of the Mahanayak Samman from the Government of West Bengal.

Dev had also been a mentor on the Bengali dance reality show Dance Bangla Dance, replacing Mithun Chakraborty. He is also a Member of Parliament in the Lok Sabha representing Ghatal constituency since 2014, as a candidate from the party All India Trinamool Congress.

Life and background
Dev was born on 25 December 1982, in Mahisha, a small village near Keshpur, to Gurudas Adhikari and Mousumi Adhikari. His father used to have a food-catering service and his mother is a housewife. His nickname is Raju. He spent his childhood living with his maternal uncle in Chandrakona and his sister, Deepali. Later in his childhood, he moved to Mumbai and attended Purushottam High School in Bandra, where he was a good student. His sister, Deepali Adhikari, was married on 9 August 2015 to Anirban.

He also did an acting course at the Kishore Namit Kapoor Acting Academy. In an interview with The Times of India, Dev recalled that when his school was closed for summer, he went to the outdoors of Prahaar: The Final Attack with his father, where Nana Patekar was shooting. He described it as more of a family vacation for them and work didn't feel like work. As a child, that was the first time he got a taste of cinema. Though that was his first, life continued to be the same for the next couple of years. The family was based in Mumbai and Dev would often accompany his father to the sets of Abbas–Mustan and Prakash Jha, among several others. There were times when his father would keep busy with other things and he had to chip in. Though he couldn't cook, he would do the groceries and supervise on his father's behalf. He also said there were times when he washed plates and served food. After receiving his diploma from Bharatiya Vidyapeeth University, in Pune, in Computer Engineering, Dev returned to Mumbai and started his film career as an observer on the set of Abbas–Mustan's Taarzan: The Wonder Car.

Dev is in a relationship with fellow actress Rukmini Maitra.

Film career

2005–09: Debut, early career 

Dev made his acting debut with the 2005 film Agnishapath, directed by Prabir Nandi, opposite Rachana Banerjee. The film did not perform well at the box office. By this point, the film I Love You, directed by Ravi Kinnagi, was in development at Shree Venkatesh Films. Dev met with the producers and gained the male lead role. Despite the financial success of I Love You, Dev did not take on any other roles for about 14 months. He went to Mumbai, and, dedicated to improving himself, learned dance and trained under fight choreographer Aejaz Gulab (of Shootout at Lokhandwala and Mission Istaanbul fame).

2008–10: Comeback and success 

Dev made a comeback to acting in director Raj Chakraborty's action-romance Challenge, opposite Subhashree Ganguly. The film was a huge hit in West Bengal, giving Dev a considerable popularity boost.

Dev performed item songs like "Pante Tali," and Chirodini Tumi Je Amar. The tracks and videos were very successful. He also performed an additional item number in the film Jackpot, directed by Kaushik Ganguly. The song was a remake of "Jibone ki Pabona," a track originally performed by Bengali actor Soumitra Chatterjee. Dev appeared as a cameo in Ekti Tarar Khonje directed by Abhik Mukhopadhyay.

In December 2010, Indian romantic Bengali film Shedin Dekha Hoyechilo starring Dev and Srabanti Chatterjee was released, directed by Sujit Mondol and produced by Shree Venkatesh Films. This is the second collaboration between Dev and Sujit Mondol. This movie was one of the biggest hits of 2010. The title track of the movie, being shot in Switzerland, is one of the best romantic songs of Tollywood ever. The chemistry between Dev and Srabanti is so mellifluous that it added a new flavour, which was tremendously appreciated by the audience and critics. The film had an item number by Samidh and Rishi "Khokababu jaye, Lal juto paye", which was the entry song for Dev in the movie. The song's choreographer Baba Yadav said: "Dev has done a great job. There's no doubt that he is an amazing dancer...What I like about Dev is the fact that he enjoys dancing. This shows in his movements." "Khokababu jaye, Lal juto paye" was the costliest song of Tollywood (costing nearly 50-60 million) until the release of Khokababu in January 2012, which contained the costlier item number, "Dance maare Khokababu".

In 2010, Dev received the STAR Ananda Shera notun Protibha Award, at the 2010 Shera Bangali Awards.

2011–present: Commercial and critical success 
In June 2011, Dev starred alongside Koel Mallick in Paglu, directed by Rajib Biswas. Produced by Surinder Films, this movie was the highest opener in Tollywood history before Challenge 2 was released in October 2012. Paglu is highest in terms of earning T.R.P on Bengali television till date, having a T.R.P of 12.25 when it was telecast on Star Jalsha. It even left 3 Idiots behind in the T.R.P. battle. As per Sree Venkatesh distribution head, Debasis Sarkar – "Paglu released in 166 theatres across Bengal in the first week. The second week has seen the number of theatres rising to 169. The movie is running in 17 theatres in Kolkata. The gross collections till Monday's (13 June) matinee show have crossed Rs 50 million." The film was a box-office success. This film also introduced martial art in Bengali cinema and Dev as the first martial art hero. The director said – " Dev was superb with the action sequences. He did some martial art stunts and also learnt kickboxing for two months only for my movie. I was amazed with his dedication. Bengali films haven't ever seen such action sequences before. There is a train and a bike chase sequence that was shot by Zoyeb and Dev. I was literally scared when they were shooting this sequence without any body double. Hats off to their courage". In November 2011, his movie Romeo, directed by Sujit Mondol and co-starring Subhashree Ganguly was released was released and earned Dev commendations from all sections of audience and from critics. The movie also saw Dev-Subhashree, the most talked about jodi (pair) of Tollywood and that too after two years. In December, a biography of Dev entitled Aami Dev, was released by Greymind Publications.

In January 2012, Dev starred in Khokababu, the 2nd highest-grossing Tollywood film, once again opposite Subhashree Ganguly. The film, directed by Shankar Aiyya and produced by Ashok Dhanuka Himanshu Dhanuka of Eskay Movies, is the longest running movie of 2012, remaining in theatre for more than 300 days. The film had an item number "Dance Maare Khokababu" which was the costliest song of Tollywood till Challenge 2 released in October 2012, whose title track "Challenge nibi na sala" broke the record to become the costliest song till now made in Tollywood. In 2013, he starred in Khoka 420, Rangbaaz and Chander Pahar. Though the former two films were commercial hits, with Khoka 420 and Rangbazz earning 8,000,000 and 9,000,000 respectively, the latter gave him a slight decree of critical success. Made on a budget of 15,000,000 and shot in South Africa, the film met with critical and commercial success upon release. Dola Mitra of Outlook (magazine) reviewed: "Dev charms as Shankar Choudhury, the young Bengali village boy who dreads clerkdom and wangles a job as station master of a tiny train station in Uganda, where only one train stops in a day." Besides many awards, Dev won the Kalakar Awards for his performance in the film and a Filmfare Awards East nomination. After appearing in two films, one where he gave a special appearance and another critically and commercially unsuccessful film, he gave another critically acclaimed performance in Buno Haansh, the adaptation of Samaresh Majumdar's successful novel of the same name. In 2015, he appeared in Aparna Sen's action romantic drama film Arshinagar opposite Rittika Sen. Released on Christmas 2015, Dev's performance was critically acclaimed, apart from Jisshu Sengupta and Swagata Mukherjee. Upam Buzarbaruah of The Times of India reviewed: "The high point of the film are the performances. All the actors, including Dev, have performed perfectly." His performance of a mute gangster in the 2016 action drama film Zulfiqar, earned him his second Filmfare Awards East 2017 nomination for Best Actor. Dev's first film of 2017 was Chaamp directed by Raj Chakraborty. The film got critical acclaim from critics and was a commercial success earning above 8.90 crores. His next film of 2017 was Cockpit directed by Kamaleshwar Mukherjee. The film got positive reviews from critics but failed at the Box Office. Dev next starred in Kamaleshwar Mukherjee directed Amazon Obhijaan, a sequel to the 2013 film Chander Pahar. Dev reprised his role as Shankar Rai Chodhury. The film was well received by critics and became the highest grossing Bengali film of all time earning over 48 crores. On 5 January 2018, the film was dubbed and released in five languages: Hindi, Tamil, Telugu, Odia and Assamese.

Other works

Television 
In November 2011, as a special appearance in Raj Chakraborty's serial Sobinoy Nibedon in Sananda TV, with a bevy of beauties wrapped around him, Dev showed his Romeo side, dancing to "Ami Romeo", "Khokababu jaye", "Gal mitthi mitthi bol" and "Paglu thoda sa karle romance". "I wish Naina and Joydeep a very happy married life," Dev later told t2.
Again in March 2012, Dev appeared in a holi special show 'Ronger Anandey' at Sananda TV.

In April 2010 and again in December 2011, he entered as a special guest in Mirakkel Akkel Challenger, an Indian Reality Show on Zee Bangla hosted by Mir Afsar Ali and directed by Subhankar Chattopadhyay. He also came as special guest in many shows such as Dadagiri Season 2, Season 4 etc. Dev became the main coach and judge of Dance Bangla Dance in the show's eighth season, replacing Mithun Chakraborty.

Stage 
Dev has given many stage performances and has participated in several concerts. In 2007, he performed in the Bengal Film Journalists' Association (BFJA) awards 2007. In 2009, he performed in ETV bangla prathama in a Bengali TV channel ETV Bangla. He performed in a concert also, Mon Mane Na concert in 2009. Being a terrific dancer, he's also a brilliant stage performer. He also performed in many award functions as in Star Jalsha Entertainment Awards 2009, Star Jalsha Entertainment Awards 2010, Zee Banglar Gourav Samman 2011, Star Jalsha Entertainment Awards 2011, Jaya Hey, Zee Bangalar Gourav Samman 2012.

Politics
Dev won the 2014 Lok Sabha Elections as a Trinamool Congress candidate from Ghatal constituency. He gave his maiden speech in the Lok Sabha after two years of winning the elections, in Bengali language regarding the implementation of Ghatal Master Plan.

Special appearances 
Dev has had special appearances in several films. In 2009, he made a cameo appearance in the item song "Pante tali" of Chirodini Tumi Je Amar directed by Raj Chakraborty and produced by Shree Venkatesh Films. The song was one of the leading chartbuster songs of the year.
In the same year, he appeared in an additional item number "Jibone ki Pabona" in the film Jackpot, directed by Kaushik Ganguly. The song was a cover of a track originally performed by Bengali actor Soumitra Chatterjee.

In 2010, he appeared as himself in Abhik Mukhopadhyay's Ekti Tarar Khonje.

In 2012, Dev made a cameo appearance in Bawali Unlimited, directed by Sujit Mondal.

In 2018, Dev made a cameo appearance as himself in Uma, directed by Srijit Mukherji.

In the media 
Dev topped the list Calcutta Times Most Desirable Men in the year 2013. In addition to his films, he also endorses several brands, such as Vivel-ITC Limited, Royal Stag, Shricon TMT Bars, Bakefresh Biscuits, and the television channel Jalsha Movies. He is touted as one of the richest Bengali actors and politicians with assets over  15,000,000. Before the 2014 Lok Sabha Elections the Bengali tabloid Ebela asked him if he enjoyed being in the spotlight. He replied: "...it's just like being raped, either you can enjoy or can shout." This comment sparked controversy as being inappropriate and insensitive and led to calls for him to withdraw his candidacy. Thereafter, he apolozised for his comments on his official Twitter account.

Filmography

Discography

Film soundtracks

Awards and nominations

References

External links 

 
 
 
 
 

 
1982 births
Male actors in Bengali cinema
Living people
Male actors from Mumbai
Kalakar Awards winners
21st-century Indian male actors
Bengali male actors
India MPs 2014–2019
Trinamool Congress politicians from West Bengal
Lok Sabha members from West Bengal
People from Paschim Medinipur district
Indian actor-politicians
Male actors from Kolkata
Indian male film actors
People from New Alipore
India MPs 2019–present
Producers who won the Best Popular Film Providing Wholesome Entertainment National Film Award